Mandi Bahauddin (Urdu and ) is a city in northern Punjab, Pakistan. It is also the capital of Mandi Bahauddin District. It is the 41st largest city of Pakistan by population according to the 2017 census. The city is about 220 metres above sea level and is located between the rivers Jhelum (north 12 km) and Chenab (south 39 km)

The name of the town originates from two sources, Mandi was a prefix because it was a grain market and Bahauddin was a Sufi saint whose mausoleum is in or near-by an ancient Village named Pindi Bahauddin.  It is also known as the city of lions.

History

Foundation of Mandi Bhauddin 
In 1506 C.E. a Gondal tribal Chief named Bahauddin established a settlement namely Pindi Bahauddin, after his migration from Pindi Shahjahanian to this area. The town started growing in early 20th century near the ancient village named as Chak No.51, where Sikh, Hindu and Muslim businessmen and land owners came to settle. John Alam made the map of this chak, which became the center of this new town Pindi Bahauddin. later in 1920 because of famous grain market setup in this Chak No. 51, it was given name of Mandi-Bahauddin, in 1923 all the streets and roads were laid straight and wide. In 1924 Pindi-Bahauddin Railway station was given the name of Mandi Bahauddin railway station. In 1937 when Mandi-Bahauddin was town, it was given the status of a town committee and in 1941 it got the status of a Municipal Committee. In the master plan of reconstructing this town. In 1946, nine gates and the walls were retied around this town.
One of the most famous motivational speakers from this city is Ali Zafar Gondal.

Early history
The recorded history of Mandi Bahauddin goes back to the era of Alexander the Great. Some 8 km northwest of the modern-day Mandi Bahauddin town, at the village Mong on the southern bank of the Jhelum River (Greek Hydaspes), the battle Battle of the Hydaspes River was fought between Raja Porus (Sanskrit Paurava) and Alexander. This historic battle of Jhelum River took place in 326 BCE. The kingdom of Raja Porus was situated in the northern Punjab of modern Pakistan. This was the last major fight of Alexander's career; the Macedonians, after finding a fierce resistance by Porus, and having heard of a massive 4,000 elephant force mustered by eastern kingdoms, refused to march further toward the Ganges Plains. The Sadar Gate built during the British era in 1933 is present here.

Administration
Mandi Bahauddin, the capital of the district, is also the Tehsil headquarters. Mandi Bahauddin was raised to the level of Municipal Committee in 1941.
It was given the status of Municipal Committee after the implementation of Punjab Local Government Ordinance 2001. Municipal Committee of Mandi Bahauddin Tehsil is subdivided into three tehsils and eighty Union Councils:

Demographics
As per the 1998 Census of Pakistan, the population of city was recorded as 99,496 while according to the 2017 Census of Pakistan, the population of city was risen to 198,609 with an increase of over 99.62% in 19 years.

Geography
The district forms a central portion of the Chaj Doab lying between the Jhelum and Chenab rivers. It is bounded on the north by the Jhelum river, which separates it from Jehlam district; on the west by Sargodha district; on the south by the river Chenab (which separates it from the Gujranwala and Hafizabad districts); and on the east by Gujrat district. The district comprises the Mandi Bahauddin, Phalia Tehsil, and Malikwal Tehsils.

Climate
This district has a moderate climate, hot in summer and cold in winter. During the peak of summer, the temperature may rise to  during the day, but in the winter months, the minimum temperature may fall below .

 Warmest month - June
 Coldest month - January 
 Wettest month - August

Languages
The main languages of the district are: Punjabi, the first language of % of the population; Urdu – 2.5%, Pashto 0.5% and Saraiki 0.5%

Economy
Shahtaj Sugar Mills is one of the largest sugar plants in Pakistan. It is located about 2 km west of the city. Its sub-offices are in Lahore and Karachi. The company was given top company award by Pakistan Stock Exchange three times in 1982, 1984, and 1988.

Transport
Road-Links: Mandi Bahauddin District has road links with the Lahore–Islamabad Motorway (Salam & Bhera Interchanges), Gujranwala District, Hafizabad, Gujrat, Jhelum, and Sargodha. These inter-district roads are maintained by the Provincial Highways Department.
 Railways: From Lalamusa the standard-gauge railway line to the west of the Punjab serves Mandi Bahauddin District with stations at Chak Sher Muhammad railway station, Chillianwala, Mandi Bahauddin, and Ahla onwards to Malakwal
Helipad: A facility of Helipad used for VVIP movements is also available at city Mandi Bahauddin maintained by Pakistan Rangers, Mandi Bahauddin.

Educational institutions
Following are the some of notable educational institutes in the city including government schools,    
1: government Higher Secondary  school Sohawa bolani, 
3:Punjab University of Technology, Rasul (PUT Rasul)
Beaconhouse School System
Punjab College of Science
Punjab Group of Colleges
The Superior College
MIMS Computer College

Medical facilities

District Headquarter Hospital, Mandi Bahauddin
Government Children Hospital Mandi Bahauddin

Tourism
Rasul Barrage 

Gurudwara Bhai Bannu at Mangat, Distt Mandi Bahauddin
 Mian Waheed-Uddin Park
Canal View Public Park

References

Cities and towns in Mandi Bahauddin District
Populated places in Punjab, Pakistan
Cities in Punjab (Pakistan)